Shilpa Narayan is a pop/R&B singer-songwriter based in New York City. She made her debut in 2012 and released her first album Stand Alone with the self-titled single Stand Alone and Change Your Mind. Shilpa has worked with prominent hip-hop artists such as Waka Flocka, Wale and Culture Shock and has performed at New York Fashion Week 2010.<ref>Shilpa has worked with  Waka Flocka, Wale and Culture Shock[[Vibe (magazine)|Vibe Magazine]] Accessed on October 29, 2016</ref>

Early life
Shilpa was born in Raleigh, North Carolina and lived in Atlanta, Georgia for a while. Her mother is a journalist and her father is an engineer. She studied business and marketing at Georgia Tech. She began posting videos of herself singing on YouTube with her views exceeding well past over 500,000. After moving to New York City, Shilpa continued to post videos on YouTube. She competed and won an open mic contest at Don Hills, which helped her in gaining a small management deal who then introduced her to various producers and musicians in NYC.

Career
Shilpa started off her career by releasing her debut album Stand Alone in 2012. The album depicts her personal struggle with romantic relationships as well as the inner turmoil of identifying her true self. She then in 2013 collaborated with MySpace to release her debut single Renegade which was an instant international hit that resonated with global audiences for its electro/tribal dance beat.Artist by Richie Frieman. Retrieved November 5

In 2015, Shilpa partnered with Yahoo! Music to release her second album Through Haze which included Baby Go Home and Pinch Me.Shilpa has been a featured performed on various music channels and portals including MTV, VH1, BBC Radio, Yahoo! Music, MTV Indies, AOL Music, Vibe Magazine, Okayplayer, RyanSeacrest.com, Channel One News, ArtistDirect and Carson Daly's The Voice.Shilpa Narayan on BBC Music BBC Music Accessed on October 30, 2016 She has performed all around US including Indian Film Festival in New York City, in 2016, and at Diwali Times Square in 2013 and 2016. Recently, she performed in Canada and China.'The Voice AMP Radio-Style: Shilpa Narayan. Retrieved October 30, 2016

DiscographyStand Alone (2012)Renegade (2013)Through Haze'' (2015)

References

External links
Official Website

Living people
American women singer-songwriters
American singer-songwriters
American women singers
Year of birth missing (living people)
21st-century American women